Buddha Pind is a village in Narowal District in the province of Punjab of Pakistan. The village has a boy's middle School.

References

Villages in Narowal District